Guyana has competed in 16 Games of the Olympiads. They have never competed in the Olympic Winter Games. For the first 5 games they appeared as British Guiana. The country has won a single medal, a bronze in boxing won by Michael Anthony at the 1980 Summer Olympics.

The Guyana Olympic Association was created in 1935 and recognized by the International Olympic Committee in 1948.

Medal tables

Medals by Summer Games

Medals by sport

List of medalists

See also
 List of flag bearers for Guyana at the Olympics

External links
 
 
 

 
Olympics